Qaradırnaq (also, Karadyrnak and Karadyrnakh) is a village and municipality in the Barda Rayon of Azerbaijan.  It has a population of 633.

References

Populated places in Barda District